Acrobasis advenella is a species of snout moth in the genus Acrobasis. It was described by Johann Zincken in 1818 and is found in most of Europe.

The wingspan is 17–24 mm. The moth flies in one generation from July to August ..

The larvae feed on Crataegus, Pyrus and Sorbus aucuparia.

Notes
The flight season refers to Belgium and the Netherlands. This may vary in other parts of the range.

References

External links

 waarneming.nl 
 Lepidoptera of Belgium
 Acrobasis advenella on UKmoths

Moths described in 1818
Acrobasis
Moths of Europe
Taxa named by Johann Leopold Theodor Friedrich Zincken